Andrew Murray (9 May 1828 – 18 January 1917) was a South African writer, teacher and Christian pastor. Murray considered missions to be "the chief end of the church".

Early life and education 
Andrew Murray was the second child of Andrew Murray Sr. (1794–1866), a Dutch Reformed Church missionary sent from Scotland to South Africa. He was born in Graaff Reinet, South Africa. His mother, Maria Susanna Stegmann, was of French Huguenot and German Lutheran descent.

Murray was sent to the University of Aberdeen in Scotland for his initial education, together with his elder brother, John. Both remained there until they obtained their master's degrees in 1845. During this time they were influenced by Scottish revival meetings and the ministry of Robert Murray McCheyne, Horatius Bonar, and William Burns. From there, they both went to the University of Utrecht where they studied theology. The two brothers became members of Het Réveil, a religious revival movement opposed to the rationalism which was in vogue in the Netherlands at that time. Both brothers were ordained by the Hague Committee of the Dutch Reformed Church on 9 May 1848 and returned to the Cape.

Murray married Emma Rutherford in Cape Town, South Africa, on 2 July 1856. They had eight children together (four boys and four girls).

Residence in Utrecht
In 1846 they lived in the Minrebroederstraat (number unknown).

From 1847 to 1848 they lived at the Zadelstraat 39.

Religious work in South Africa 
Murray pastored churches in Bloemfontein, Worcester, Cape Town and Wellington, all in South Africa. He was a champion of the South African Revival of 1860.

In 1889, he was one of the founders of the South African General Mission (SAGM), along with Martha Osborn and Spencer Walton. After Martha Osborn married George Howe, they formed the South East Africa General Mission (SEAGM) in 1891. SAGM and SEAGM merged in 1894. Because its ministry had spread into other African countries, the mission's name was changed to Africa Evangelical Fellowship (AEF) in 1965. AEF joined with Serving In Mission (SIM) in 1998 and continues to this day.

Through his writings, Murray was also a key "Inner Life" or "Higher Life" or Keswick leader, and his theology of faith healing and belief in the continuation of the apostolic gifts made him a significant forerunner of the Pentecostal movement.

In 1894, Murray was visited by John McNeill and Rev. J Gelson Gregson, the ex-British Army Chaplain and Keswick convention speaker.

Death
Murray died on 18 January 1917, four months before his 89th birthday. He was so influenced by Johann Christoph Blumhardt's Möttlingen revival that he included a portion of Friedrich Zündel's biography at the end of With Christ in the School of Prayer.

Works 
A bibliography compiled by D. S. B. Joubert estimates that Murray published over 240 books and tracts; this number includes about 50 books, many of them authored in both Dutch and English, including:
 Abide in Christ
 Absolute Surrender
 Be Perfect
 Divine Healing
 God's Will: Our Dwelling Place
 Holy in Christ
 How to Raise Your Children for Christ
 Humility: The Journey Toward Holiness (1884)
 Let Us Draw Nigh – 1894
 Like Christ
 Money
The Deeper Christian Life
 The Lord's Table
 The Holiest of All: An Exposition of the Epistle to the Hebrews
 The Master's Indwelling
 The Ministry of Intercession
 The Power of the Blood of Christ
 The Prayer Life
 The School of Obedience
 The Spirit of Christ
 The Spiritual Life
 The True Vine
 The Two Covenants
 Thy Will Be Done
 Waiting on God
 With Christ in the School of Prayer
 Working for God!
 The Dearth of Conversions
 Jesus Himself
 Lord Teach Us to Pray Or, The Only Teacher

References

External links 

 
 
 
Works by Andrew Murray a complete list of over 60 of his English books, in chronological order.
 List of works by Andrew Murray with links to online and ebook versions.
 Andrew Murray, Keswick / Higher Life Leader: a Biographical Sketch, in The Doctrine of Sanctification, Thomas D. Ross, Ph.D. dissertation, Great Plains Baptist Divinity School, 2014
 True Vine Audio 
 World Invisible Online Library Includes many Murray books
 Path2Prayer "has a collection of 40 Murray books in pdf form"
 Short Bio from The Healing and Revival Press
 Short Bio from the Wellington Museum
 Andrew Murray Centre in Wellington, South Africa
 Andrew Murray Bible School in South Africa

South African writers
South African evangelicals
1828 births
1917 deaths
Members of the Dutch Reformed Church in South Africa
Dutch Reformed Church missionaries
Dutch evangelicals
Utrecht University alumni
People from Graaff-Reinet
Alumni of the University of Aberdeen